"Obvious" is the third and final single released from Irish boy band Westlife's fourth studio album, Turnaround (2003). The track was written by Pilot, Savan Kotecha, and Andreas Carlsson and was produced by Jake Schulze, Kristian Lundin, and Karl Engström, with additional production from Quiz & Larossi. It is composed in the traditional verse–chorus form in E major, with the group's vocals ranging from the chords of C♯4 to A5. This was the last Westlife single to be recorded with their full original lineup, as Brian McFadden left the month after its release.

"Obvious" peaked at number three on the UK Singles Chart but marked the departure of Brian McFadden from the band. The band originally planned to write a farewell song for McFadden, as it was his choice to leave; however, due to tour rehearsals and TV appearances, it was decided that "Obvious" would be released as a single instead. As a tribute, CD2 features a medley of McFadden's favourite Westlife songs.

Track listings
UK CD1
 "Obvious" (single remix)
 "I'm Missing Loving You"
 "To Be with You" (live from the Greatest Hits tour)
 "Obvious" (video)
 "Obvious" (making of the video)

UK CD2
 "Obvious" (single remix)
 "Westlife Hits Medley" (Flying Without Wings/My Love/Mandy)

European CD single
 "Obvious" (single remix)
 "Lost in You"

Charts

Weekly charts

Year-end charts

References

External links
 Official Westlife website

2000s ballads
2003 songs
2004 singles
Bertelsmann Music Group singles
RCA Records singles
Song recordings produced by Quiz & Larossi
Songs written by Andreas Carlsson
Songs written by Carl Falk
Songs written by Didrik Thott
Songs written by Savan Kotecha
Songs written by Sebastian Thott
Syco Music singles
Westlife songs